Junak is a Polish brand , imported by Almot since 2010. Continuation of production of SFM Junak in modern form.

junak was established in 1983. In 2010, junak presented the motorcycle using the name and distinctive logo of Junak: Junak M16, also known as Regal Raptor Daytona. In subsequent years Almot introduced to the market under the name Junak number of other models of motorcycles, mopeds and scooters. Junak M16 and Junak M11 developed under license of other motorbikes. 
Motorcycles:
Choppers/Cruisers:
Junak M11
Junak M16
Sport bikes:
Junak 122 RS (naked), Junak 122 Sport
Junak 124
Junak S200
Junak NK650
Junak RS125
Classical:
Junak 121
Junak 122
Junak 123
Junak M20
Junak M25
Mopeds:
Sport mopeds:
 Sport
Junak 903 Race
Junak 904
Junak 905
Classical:
 
Junak 902

External links
Official website of Junak

References 

Motorcycle manufacturers of Poland
Science and technology in Poland
Junak
Moped manufacturers
Polish brands